The Arizona Daily Star Building is a historic two-story building in Tucson, Arizona. It was designed by Alexander P. Petit in the Italianate style, and built in 1883. From 1883 to 1917, it housed the offices of the Arizona Daily Star, whose editor L. C. Hughes, later served as the governor of the Arizona Territory. The building has been listed on the National Register of Historic Places since February 22, 2002.

References

External links

National Register of Historic Places in Pima County, Arizona
Italianate architecture in Arizona
Commercial buildings completed in 1883
1883 establishments in Arizona Territory